Kim Min-seok (born 14 June 1999) is a South Korean speed skater. He participated in the 2018 Winter Olympics and won a bronze medal in the 1500 m race, skating in his first ever Olympic event. He became the first Asian athlete to medal at this event. Kim then added to his medal tally by winning a silver medal in the  team pursuit event.

Filmography

Variety show

References

 
 

Living people
1999 births
South Korean male speed skaters
Speed skaters at the 2018 Winter Olympics
Speed skaters at the 2022 Winter Olympics
Olympic speed skaters of South Korea
Olympic silver medalists for South Korea
Olympic bronze medalists for South Korea
Medalists at the 2018 Winter Olympics
Medalists at the 2022 Winter Olympics
Olympic medalists in speed skating
Speed skaters at the 2016 Winter Youth Olympics
Speed skaters at the 2017 Asian Winter Games
Asian Games medalists in speed skating
Asian Games gold medalists for South Korea
Asian Games bronze medalists for South Korea
Medalists at the 2017 Asian Winter Games
People from Anyang, Gyeonggi
Youth Olympic gold medalists for South Korea
Sportspeople from Gyeonggi Province
20th-century South Korean people
21st-century South Korean people